Rollier is a surname. Notable people with the surname include:

Charles Rollier (1912–1968), Swiss painter
Baptiste Rollier (born 1982), Swiss orienteering competitor.
Francois Rollier (1915–1992), educated and when younger employed as a lawyer, joined the Michelin company in 1956
Michel Rollier (born 1944), French industrialist in the automobile industry